Sakyas may refer to:

 people of Shakya ethnicity
 members of the Sakya Tibetan Buddhist school